The Canadian Society of Forensic Science (CSFS) is a professional association aimed at maintaining professional standards and promoting and enhancing the study and stature of forensic science. Membership in the society is open internationally to professionals with an active interest in the forensic sciences.

History 
The CSFS was founded on October 16, 1953 in Ottawa, Ontario, Canada. The founding members were  William Wallace Sutherland, Charles George Farmilo, James Alexander Churchman, Blake B. Coldwell, and  Leo Levi. The society officially became a non-profit corporation on April 10, 1963 with the signing of the Letters Patent under the authority of the Companies Act.

Present structure 
The CSFS has an Executive Committee consisting of elected Officials and a Board of Directors. In addition there are several standing and special committees, including Awards, Finance, Membership, Nominating, Publication, Accreditation, Alcohol Test, Constitution, Drugs and Driving, and Informatics/Education.

The CSFS is further organized into sections representing diverse areas of forensic science, as follows:  
Anthropology, Medical and Odontology
Biology
Chemistry
Documents
Engineering
Firearms
Toxicology

There are six types of membership in the society:  Regular, Fellow, Emeritus, Provisional, Associate and Student. As of May 2022, the society had 425 members of all types.

Journal 
The society publishes the peer-reviewed, quarterly Journal of the Canadian Society of Forensic Science. It is devoted to the publication of original papers, comments, and reviews in all branches of forensic science, as well as other matters of forensic interest ( e.g., social sciences, law enforcement and/or jurisprudence).  Abstracts from 1995 to the present are available online at the CSFS website.

Conference 
The society holds a professional conference and Annual General Meeting. The location and specific dates vary each year.

Awards 
The society gives out the following awards:
 Rita Charlebois Award, to provide financial assistance to a deserving candidate(s) to attend scientific meetings
 CSFS Memorial Award, to posthumously commemorate the contributions to forensic science in Canada of society members who have died
 CSFS Education Award,  an annual award for promoting the field of forensic science
 The Derome Award, to honour those individuals who had been active in the establishment of the profession in Canada
 H. Ward Smith Award, to commemorate the contribution to forensic science in Canada of the late H. Ward Smith.

See also 
Canadian Identification Society
Forensics

References

External links 

Law enforcement in Canada
Forensics organizations
Organizations established in 1953
Professional associations based in Canada
1953 establishments in Ontario